This is a list of newspapers published in Western Australia in languages other than English.

References

External links 
 Australia Asia Business Weekly
 Australian Chinese Times

 
Western Australia